Sima Zhao's Regicide, also known as the Ganlu Incident (Chinese: 甘露之變), was an incident that occurred on 2 June 260, in Luoyang, the capital of the state of Cao Wei, during the Three Kingdoms period. Cao Mao, the nominal emperor of Wei, attempted to oust the regent Sima Zhao, who effectively controlled the Wei government. However, the plot concluded with Cao Mao's death and Sima Zhao retaining his status. Contrary to its intention, the incident actually increased the Sima clan's power and influence in Wei, thus providing a foundation for the eventual usurpation of the Wei throne in 266 by Sima Zhao's son Sima Yan, who founded the Western Jin Dynasty.

The incident is also mentioned in the historical novel Romance of the Three Kingdoms by Luo Guanzhong, which dramatises the history of the late Eastern Han Dynasty and the Three Kingdoms period. The events of the incident described in the novel are largely similar to that described in historical sources.

Background
The state of Cao Wei was established in 220 by Cao Pi, which marked the start of the Three Kingdoms period in China. The authority of the Wei imperial family had been weakening since the death of the second Wei emperor, Cao Rui, and reached a nadir after the Incident at Gaoping Tombs in 249, when the Wei general Sima Yi seized power from the regent Cao Shuang. Sima Yi died in 251 and was succeeded by his sons Sima Shi and Sima Zhao, who effectively controlled the Wei government.

In 254, Sima Shi deposed the third Wei ruler, Cao Fang, and installed a 13-year-old Cao Mao on the throne. From the start of his reign, Cao Mao acted in defiance of the Simas, refusing to accept the imperial seal directly from Sima Shi, and, after Sima Shi's death in 255, he attempted to order Sima Zhao to remain in Xuchang to keep watch over Shouchun (present-day Shou County, Anhui), where a rebellion led by Guanqiu Jian and Wen Qin had just been suppressed. However, Sima Zhao ignored Cao Mao's edict and returned to the capital Luoyang. While Sima Zhao administered state affairs, Cao Mao attempted to gain the favour of the literati in the court through unremarkable meetings to discuss literature with some officials—Sima Zhao's cousin Sima Wang, Wang Shen (王沈), Pei Xiu, and Zhong Hui. Cao Mao also provided Sima Wang with a chariot and five imperial guardsmen as escorts because the latter lived further away from the palace than the others.

In 258, Sima Zhao was offered the title of Duke of Jin and the nine bestowments (over nine times), all of which he declined. Discussion and debate over the matter allowed him to judge his level of support.

A year later, in 259, Cao Mao received sightings of yellow dragons in two wells, and he wrote a poem identifying the dragons as being trapped inside wells and likened himself to the dragons. Sima Zhao saw the poem and was angry.

In 260, Sima Zhao was again offered title of Duke of Jin and the nine bestowments and did not immediately decline.

The incident
On 2 June 260, 19-year-old Cao Mao gathered his associates Wang Shen, Wang Jing, and Wang Ye, declaring his intention to make a last-ditch attempt to overthrow Sima Zhao, even at the cost of his life.

Wang Jing advised the emperor against such an action, but Cao Mao ignored Wang Jing's advice and informed Empress Dowager Guo of his plan. In his absence, Wang Shen and Wang Ye secretly deserted Cao Mao and notified Sima Zhao about the plot.

Cao Mao then led his forces from the palace, personally wielding a sword. Sima Zhao's younger brother Sima Zhou attempted to put up resistance at one of the gates, but was defeated and fled. Sima Zhao's aide Jia Chong led another defence at the South Watchtower. When Cheng Ji (成濟), a military officer under Jia Chong, asked Jia what to do, Jia told him to defend the Sima clan regardless of the consequences. Cheng Ji then approached Cao Mao and killed the emperor with his spear.

Aftermath
After Cao Mao's death, the public called for Jia Chong's execution on the grounds that he had committed regicide. Sima Zhao forced Empress Dowager Guo to posthumously demote Cao Mao to the status of a commoner, and then ordered Wang Jing and his clan to be executed. The following day, after pleas from his uncle Sima Fu, Sima Zhao asked Empress Dowager Guo to posthumously instate Cao Mao as the "Duke of Gaogui" (高貴鄉公) and bury Cao Mao with the ceremonies befitting that of a prince, though this was not actually done. Cao Huang (later renamed to Cao Huan), the Duke of Changdao (常道鄉公), was chosen to succeed Cao Mao and was installed on the throne. 19 days later, Sima Zhao had Cheng Ji and his family executed to appease public anger but Jia Chong was spared.

Sima Zhao successfully retained his power during the incident and eliminated his opponents in the Wei court, leaving only the young Cao Huan as a puppet emperor under his control. He did not take the Wei throne, even until his death, but was granted the title of a vassal king—"King of Jin" (晉王)—and the nine bestowments by Cao Huan in 264. Sima Zhao died in September 265 and was succeeded by his son Sima Yan, who forced Cao Huan to abdicate in his favour in February 266 and established the Western Jin Dynasty.

See also
 Three Rebellions in Shouchun

Notes

References

 Chen, Shou (3rd century). Records of the Three Kingdoms (Sanguozhi).
 Fang, Xuanling (648). Book of Jin (Jin Shu).

260
Cao Wei
3rd-century coups d'état and coup attempts
Military coups in China
260s conflicts